Phosphatidylinositol-5-phosphate 4-kinase, type II, gamma is an enzyme in humans that is encoded by the PIP4K2C gene. It is one of the phosphatidylinositol 4-phosphate 5-kinases.

References

External links 
 PDBe-KB provides an overview of all the structure information available in the PDB for Human Phosphatidylinositol 5-phosphate 4-kinase type-2 gamma (PIP4K2C)

Genes on human chromosome 12
EC 2.7.1